Hampus Bergdahl (born 5 February 1995) is a Swedish footballer who plays for Mjällby AIF as a defender. He previously played collegiately in the United States.

Career

Club career
Bergdahl is a product of Asarums IF FK, which he left for Mjällby AIF at the age of 16 in 2011. Bergdahl made his Allsvenskan debut on 27 July 2014 in a 3-0 win over IFK Göteborg, where he was substituted in the 66th minute.

In July 2015, Bergdahl was loaned out his parent club Asarums IF for the rest of the season. He played nine games and scored a goal for the club in Division 2.

In January 2016, Bergdahl moved to the United States to study at Syracuse University. He played six matches for the university's football team in 2016. During the summer holidays of college education, Bergdahl was back in Asarums IF and played eight matches and scored one goal in Division 2 in 2016.

In January 2020, Bergdahl was recruited by Team TG FF, where he signed a one-year contract with an option for another year.

References

External links

1995 births
Living people
Swedish footballers
Swedish expatriate footballers
Association football defenders
Mjällby AIF players
Division 2 (Swedish football) players
Allsvenskan players
Swedish expatriate sportspeople in the United States